The Janakpuri West Metro Station is an interchange station between the Blue Line and Magenta Line of Delhi Metro.

History

Phase III
Under Phase III, Janakpuri West station has become an interchange station with the Magenta line (Janakpuri West – Botanical Garden). From here, passengers can connect to South Delhi and Noida via. Indira Gandhi International Airport Terminal 1, Hauz Khas and Kalkaji Mandir.

The section was inaugurated on 28 May 2018 by Honorable Chief Minister, Mr. Arvind Kejriwal & Union Minister, Mr. Hardeep Singh Puri. Commercial operations began started 29 May 2018.

India's Highest Escalators
The escalators installed at the new Janakpuri West Metro station have the highest elevation for
any escalator in India. These escalators have a height of 15.65 meters, equal to a five-story building, that surpasses the height of the escalators installed at the Kashmere Gate metro station, which are 14.575 meters tall.
The horizontal length of the escalators is 35.32 meters. The weight of each escalator was 26 tonnes and a 250-tonne
crane was specially planted for the installation of these escalators.

The station

Station layout

Facilities
Facilities: Escalator (for going up only) on both sides.

Nearby attractions (within walking distance): Janak Palace Shopping complex, Inox Theatre (Earlier: Satyam Cineplex), Sagar Ratna Restaurant, Piccadilly Hotel (earlier known as Hotel Hilton). This station also serves to the people of Vikaspuri.

Entry/Exit

Connections
Janak Puri West Metro Station serves as an interchange between Blue Line and Magenta Line of the Delhi Metro.

Bus
Delhi Transport Corporation bus routes number 588, 810, 813, 813CL, 816, 816A, 816EXT, 817, 817A, 817B, 818, 819, 822, 823, 824, 824SSTL, 825, 826, 827, 828, 829, 833, 834, 835, 836, 838, 838A, 845, 847, 861A, 871, 871A, 872, 873, 876, 878, 891STL, 972A, 972BSPL and By Pass Express serve the station.

Gallery

See also

Delhi
List of Delhi Metro stations
Transport in Delhi
Delhi Metro Rail Corporation
Delhi Suburban Railway
Delhi Monorail
Delhi Transport Corporation
West Delhi
New Delhi
National Capital Region (India)
List of rapid transit systems
List of metro systems

References

External links

 Delhi Metro Rail Corporation Ltd. (Official site) 
 Delhi Metro Annual Reports
 
 UrbanRail.Net – Descriptions of all metro systems in the world, each with a schematic map showing all stations.

Delhi Metro stations
Railway stations opened in 2005
Railway stations in West Delhi district